Psalm 45 is the 45th psalm of the Book of Psalms, beginning in English in the King James Version: "My heart is inditing a good matter". In the slightly different numbering system used in the Greek Septuagint and Latin Vulgate translations of the Bible, this psalm is Psalm 44. In Latin, it is known as "Eructavit cor meum". It was composed by the sons of Korach on (or "according to") the shoshanim–either a musical instrument or the tune to which the psalm should be sung. The psalm has been interpreted as an epithalamium, or wedding song, written to a king on the day of his marriage to a foreign woman, and is one of the royal psalms.

The psalm forms a regular part of Jewish, Catholic, Lutheran, Anglican and other Protestant liturgies.

Background
According to classical Jewish sources, Psalm 45 refers to the Jewish Messiah. According to Metzudot, a classical Jewish commentary, the king mentioned in verse 2 is the Jewish Messiah.

Christian scholars frequently interpret the psalm as a Messianic prophecy. Henry explains the prophecy as referring to Jesus as both the future king and a bridegroom of the church. In Hebrews  1:8–9, verses 6–7 of this psalm are quoted as allusions to Jesus.

Themes
Shoshanim (roses) can refer to either a musical instrument shaped like a rose (shoshana in Hebrew), or the tune to which the psalm should be sung. Rashi proposes that the term refers to Torah scholars, and interprets the rest of the psalm according to the scholars' efforts in and reward for Torah study.

Jesuit writer Mitchell Dahood asserts that the psalm is an epithalamium, or a wedding song, written to a king on the day of his marriage to a foreign woman, and is one of the royal psalms. Die Bibel mit Erklärungen states that Psalm 45 is the only example of profane poetry in the Psalms and was composed and sung by a minstrel or cult prophets on the occasion of the marriage of the king. In the 19th century, Franz Delitzsch argued that the poem was written on the occasion of Jehoram of Judah's marriage to Athaliah; John Calvin and Alexander Kirkpatrick both maintained that it referred rather to the marriage of Solomon with an Egyptian princess. Charles Spurgeon, however, rejects these interpretations, stating: "Maschil, an instructive ode, not an idle lay, or a romancing ballad, but a Psalm of holy teaching, didactic and doctrinal. This proves that it is to be spiritually understood. … This is no wedding song of earthly nuptials, but an Epithalamium for the Heavenly Bridegroom and his elect spouse." More recently, Near Eastern scholar Charles R. Krahmalkov posits that the wedding of Jezebel and Ahab was the likely occasion, reading verse 14 as originally referring not to a "King's daughter who is within" but a "daughter of the King of the Phoenicians (Pōnnīma)".

Verse 14 in the Hebrew, "All the glory of the king's daughter is within", encapsulates the import of tzniut (modesty) in Judaism. The Midrash Tanhuma teaches on this verse, "If a woman remains modestly at home, she is worthy that both her husband and children are Kohanim Gedolim [who wear golden clothes]."

Text

Hebrew Bible version
The following is the Hebrew text of Psalm 45:

King James Version
 My heart is inditing a good matter: I speak of the things which I have made touching the king: my tongue is the pen of a ready writer. 
 Thou art fairer than the children of men: grace is poured into thy lips: therefore God hath blessed thee for ever. 
 Gird thy sword upon thy thigh, O most mighty, with thy glory and thy majesty. 
 And in thy majesty ride prosperously because of truth and meekness and righteousness; and thy right hand shall teach thee terrible things. 
 Thine arrows are sharp in the heart of the king's enemies; whereby the people fall under thee. 
 Thy throne, O God, is for ever and ever: the sceptre of thy kingdom is a right sceptre. 
 Thou lovest righteousness, and hatest wickedness: therefore God, thy God, hath anointed thee with the oil of gladness above thy fellows. 
 All thy garments smell of myrrh, and aloes, and cassia, out of the ivory palaces, whereby they have made thee glad. 
 Kings' daughters were among thy honourable women: upon thy right hand did stand the queen in gold of Ophir. 
 Hearken, O daughter, and consider, and incline thine ear; forget also thine own people, and thy father's house; 
 So shall the king greatly desire thy beauty: for he is thy Lord; and worship thou him. 
 And the daughter of Tyre shall be there with a gift; even the rich among the people shall intreat thy favour. 
 The king's daughter is all glorious within: her clothing is of wrought gold. 
 She shall be brought unto the king in raiment of needlework: the virgins her companions that follow her shall be brought unto thee. 
 With gladness and rejoicing shall they be brought: they shall enter into the king's palace. 
 Instead of thy fathers shall be thy children, whom thou mayest make princes in all the earth. 
 I will make thy name to be remembered in all generations: therefore shall the people praise thee for ever and ever.

Revised Standard Version
The verse marking for this psalm in the Revised Standard Version (RSV) differs from that used in other translations.

Uses

Judaism
In the Siddur Avodas Yisrael, Psalm 45 is recited as a Song of the Day on Shabbat Chayei Sarah and Shabbat Pekudei.

This psalm is said as a general prayer for the end of the exile and the coming of the Mashiach.

New Testament
Verses 6 and 7 are quoted in the Epistle to the Hebrews 1:8–9.

Catholic Church 
Since the early Middle Ages, monasteries have traditionally performed this psalm during the celebration of Monday matins, according to the Rule of St. Benedict (530). In modern times in the Liturgy of the Hours, Psalm 45 is sung or recited, in two parts, at Vespers on Monday of the second week of the four-weekly cycle, and at the midday office on Saturday of the fourth week. The portion of the Psalm which refers to the 'Queen, in gold of Ophir' is also one of the set readings for mass on the Feast of the Assumption of the Blessed Virgin Mary.

Book of Common Prayer
In the Church of England's Book of Common Prayer, this psalm is appointed to be read on the morning of the ninth day of the month.

Musical settings 
Heinrich Schütz wrote a setting of a paraphrase of Psalm 45 in German, "Mein Herz dichtet ein Lied mit Fleiß", SWV 142, for the Becker Psalter, published first in 1628.

References

Sources

Further reading

External links 

 
 
 Text of Psalm 45 according to the 1928 Psalter
 Psalms Chapter 45 text in Hebrew and English, mechon-mamre.org
 For the leader; according to "Lilies." A maskil of the Korahites. A love song. / My heart is stirred by a noble theme text and footnotes, usccb.org United States Conference of Catholic Bishops
 Psalm 45:1 introduction and text, biblestudytools.com
 Psalm 45 enduringword.com
 Psalm 45 / Refrain: Behold our defender, O God, and look upon the face of your anointed. Church of England
 Psalm 45 at biblegateway.com
 Hymns for Psalm 45 hymnary.org

045
Phoenicians in the Hebrew Bible